Medronic acid (conjugate base, medronate), also known as methylene diphosphonate, is the smallest bisphosphonate. Its complex with radioactive technetium, 99mTc medronic acid, is used in nuclear medicine to detect bone abnormalities, including metastases.

References

External links 
 

Bisphosphonates